Bertrand de Languissel was an important 12th century Catholic Bishop in France.
 He was ordained  Bishop of Nîmes on 6 Oct 1280 and held office until 8 January 1323 when he died in office.

References

Bishops of Nîmes
1323 deaths